Marcel Proust (1871–1922) was a French author.

Proust may also refer to:

People
 Joseph Proust (1754–1826), French chemist, responsible for the Law of definite proportions
 Antonin Proust (1832–1905), French journalist and politician
 Adrien Proust (1834–1903, French epidemiologist and hygienist
 Jean-Paul Proust (1940–2010), former Minister of State of Monaco
 Christine Proust (born 1953), French historian of mathematics and Assyriologist
 Caroline Proust (born 1967), French actress

Other uses
 Proust (Beckett essay) (1931), an essay by Samuel Beckett
 Proust Questionnaire, a personality test 
 4474 Proust, a main-belt asteroid
 Proust (crater), on Mercury

See also
 Prost (disambiguation)